The 1903 ball in the Winter Palace (lit. "Costume ball of 1903") was a luxurious ball during the reign of the Emperor Nicholas II of Russia. It was held in the Winter Palace, Saint Petersburg, in two stages, on February 11 and 13. All the visitors were in bejeweled 17th-century style costumes, made from designs by the artist Sergey Solomko, in collaboration with historical experts.

Grand Duke Alexander Mikhailovitch recalled the occasion as "the last spectacular ball in the history of the empire ... [but] a new and hostile Russia glared through the large windows of the palace ... while we danced, the workers were striking and the clouds in the Far East were hanging dangerously low."

The entire Imperial family posed in 17th-century costumes, Emperor Nicholas as Alexis, the Empress Alexandra as Maria Miloslavskaya, in the Hermitage Theatre, many wearing priceless original items brought specially from the Kremlin, for what was to be their final photograph together.

Photographs from the souvenir album

References

External links 

 "Costume Ball in the Winter Palace"  @ Thornton's Bookshop
 "Colorized Images from the 1903 Winter Palace Ball" 

Balls (dance party)
Ball In The Winter Palace, 1903
Nicholas II of Russia
1900s in Saint Petersburg
Masquerade balls
1903 festivals
February 1903 events
Events in Saint Petersburg